Andrew Archer, 2nd Baron Archer (29 July 1736 – 18 April 1778), 18th-century British Whig politician, styled the Hon. Andrew Archer between 1747 and 1768.

Life
The son of Thomas, 1st Baron Archer, by Catherine, daughter of Sir Thomas Tipping, 1st Baronet, he was educated at Eton College before going up to Trinity College, Oxford.

In 1761 he was returned to Parliament for both Bramber and Coventry, but chose to sit for Coventry, which he represented until 1768 when he succeeded to his father's title and took his seat in the House of Lords.

He inherited Umberslade Hall near Tanworth and served as Recorder of Coventry from 1769 until his death.

Lord Archer died at Portman Square, Marylebone, London, in April 1778, aged 41, and was buried at Tanworth. His monument was sculpted by John Hickey.

He married Sarah, daughter of James West of Alscot Park, in 1761 and had one son and 4 daughters. 
His son predeceased him and thus the peerage became extinct, but his properties (Umberslade, Pyrgo and a town house in London) were divided between his wife and daughters.

Umberslade eventually passed to Sarah, Countess of Plymouth, who married secondly William, 1st Earl Amherst.

Lady Archer moved to London with her daughters and living up to being a grand dame then became the subject of a series of malicious caricatures in the press. She died at Charles Street, Grosvenor Square, London, in February 1801, aged 59.

Ancestry

References

External links
Archer genealogy : Stirnet.com

1736 births
1778 deaths
Politicians from London
People educated at Eton College
Alumni of Trinity College, Oxford
Members of the Parliament of Great Britain for Coventry
British MPs 1761–1768
Place of birth missing
2